Lee Yoon-ji (born March 15, 1984) is a South Korean actress. After making her acting debut in the sitcom Nonstop 4, Lee has starred in the television series Pure 19 (2004), Princess Hours (2006), Dream High (2011), The King 2 Hearts (2012), and Wang's Family (2013). She also appeared in season 1 reality-variety show We Got Married (2008-2009), as well as the romantic comedy film Couples (2011).

Career
Lee made her acting debut in 2003 on the MBC sitcom Nonstop 4. She has since starred in many small screen projects such as Pure 19 (KBS, 2004), Princess Hours (MBC, 2006), King Sejong the Great (KBS, 2008), Dream High (KBS, 2011), The King 2 Hearts (MBC, 2012), and The Great Seer (SBS, 2012).

The same year she was hosting the entertainment news program Entertainment Weekly on KBS, Lee was also partnered with Super Junior member Kang-in in season 1 of the reality show We Got Married. She made her theater debut in the 2010 Korean staging of the Pulitzer Prize-winning play Proof.

In 2011 Lee landed her first big-screen leading role in romantic comedy Couples.

She, Danny Park and Kim Eui-sung starred in 992, a 13-minute film made by Wonsuk Chin using the iPhone 4S. The short, which premiered at the 2012 Macworld and was streamed on YouTube, is named after the New Balance running shoes favored by the late Apple CEO Steve Jobs.

Lee stepped in to host the SBS talk show Healing Camp, Aren't You Happy for one episode, after the father of friend and agency mate Han Hye-jin died in November 2012.

From 2013 to 2014, Lee played one of the leading roles in Wang's Family, an ensemble family drama that received high ratings, peaking at 48.3%. She next starred in police procedural Dr. Frost (2014) and romantic comedy Ex-Girlfriends' Club.

Personal life
Lee married a dentist on September 27, 2014, at the 63 Building in Yeouido, Seoul.
On October 7, 2015, Lee gave birth to their daughter.

Filmography

Film

Television series

Web series

Variety show

Music video

Radio shows

Theater

Discography

Awards and nominations

References

External links
 Lee Yoon-ji at Namoo Actors

1984 births
Living people
South Korean Roman Catholics
South Korean film actresses
South Korean television actresses
South Korean stage actresses
Chung-Ang University alumni